Babs Olusanmokun (born September 18, 1984) is a Nigerian-American actor. In 2017, he appeared in "Black Museum", an episode of the anthology series Black Mirror. He also appeared in the video game Max Payne 3 as Serrano, for which he provides both acting and voice content. In 2021 he appeared as Jamis in Dune. He plays Dr. Joseph M'Benga in the Paramount+ original series Star Trek: Strange New Worlds (since 2022).

Personal life
Olusanmokun was born in Lagos, Nigeria, and is based in New York.

Olusanmokun is fluent in English, French and Portuguese, and is a Brazilian jiu-jitsu black belt and champion.

Filmography

Film

Television

Video games

References

External links

Living people
1984 births
American people of Nigerian descent
Nigerian male film actors
Nigerian male voice actors
Nigerian male video game actors
Nigerian male television actors
American male film actors
American male television actors
American male video game actors
American male voice actors
Male actors from Lagos
20th-century American male actors
21st-century American male actors
20th-century Nigerian male actors
21st-century Nigerian male actors